Chad Salmela is a former member of the U.S. biathlon team from 1990-1998. He currently is an analyst for NBC Olympics' biathlon and cross-country skiing.
 
Salmela has been an analyst for NBC since the 2006 Winter Olympics. Formerly, he was an athlete representative to the U.S. Biathlon Association's Board of Directors and the U.S. Olympic Committee Athletes Advisory Council from 2000-2008. 
He also currently  serves as the coach of the NCAA varsity cross-country ski team, and assistant track and field coach at The College of St. Scholastica in Duluth, Minnesota.

Salmela was the broadcaster who memorably shouted "Here comes Diggins! Here comes Diggins!" and "Yes! Yes! Yes! Yes! Gold!” in the NBC broadcast of Jessie Diggins and Kikkan Randall's historic, gold medal-winning team sprint relay at the 2018 Winter Olympics in South Korea.

See also
Olympics on NBC commentators

References

American male biathletes
Olympic Games broadcasters
NBC Sports
Living people
1971 births
20th-century American people